Vyacheslav Eduardovich Rodin (born 24 February 1981) is a former Russian professional football player.

Club career
He played in the Russian Football National League for FC Lada Togliatti in 2006.

References

External links
 

1981 births
Living people
Russian footballers
Association football defenders
FC Zenit-2 Saint Petersburg players
FC Lada-Tolyatti players
FC Dynamo Saint Petersburg players
FC Sakhalin Yuzhno-Sakhalinsk players